Paragnia fulvomaculata is a species of beetle in the family Cerambycidae, and the only species in the genus Paragnia. It was described by Gahan in 1893.

References

Lamiini
Beetles described in 1893